Marcelo Wálter Fracchia Bilbao (born 4 January 1968, in Montevideo) is a former Uruguayan footballer.

Club career
Fracchia spent most of his career in Chile, including playing for Deportes Temuco, Colo Colo, Unión Española and Everton de Viña del Mar.

International career
Fracchia earned seven caps for the senior Uruguay national football team during 1991. He made his debut in a friendly match against Chile (2-1 win) on June 26, 1991, in the Estadio Centenario in Montevideo.

Personal life
He is the father of the professional footballer Matías Fracchia, who was born in Chile, but has represented Uruguay as well as the United States at youth level.

References

 

1968 births
Living people
Uruguayan footballers
Uruguayan expatriate footballers
Uruguay international footballers
1991 Copa América players
Central Español players
Colo-Colo footballers
Unión Española footballers
Deportes Concepción (Chile) footballers
Everton de Viña del Mar footballers
Deportes Temuco footballers
Expatriate footballers in Chile
Uruguayan expatriate sportspeople in Chile
New Jersey Stallions players
Footballers from Montevideo
USL League Two players
Association football midfielders